At the 1948 Summer Olympics in London, nine events in sprint canoe racing were contested.  For the first time, a women's event was part of the Olympic program.

Medal table

Medal summary

Men's events

Women's event

References
1948 Summer Olympics official report. pp. 307–16.
 

 
1948 Summer Olympics events
1948
Canoeing and kayaking competitions in the United Kingdom